The Kenya coast galago (Paragalago cocos) is a species of primate in the family Galagidae.

Description 
The Kenya coast galago has a dark, blackish patch on either side of the muzzle, and has light brown hair covering its body. It is morphologically similar to both P. z. udzungwensis and P. z. zanzibicarus, and though it is generally slightly larger than them, it has a high interspecific overlap in body size, meaning that there has been confusion over the taxonomy of the species. However, the Kenya coast galago, like many other galagos, has its own unique call, which has been called an incremental call and separates it from any other species in the same genus.

Habitat 

References

Kenya coast galago
Mammals of Kenya
Mammals of Tanzania
Kenya coast galago
Taxa named by Edmund Heller